The Karnataka State Film Awards 1980–81 is presented by Government of Karnataka, to felicitate the best of Kannada Cinema released in the year 1980.

Film Awards

Other Awards

References

1980-81